Zijingang Campus is the main campus of Zhejiang University. Located in the west of urban Hangzhou, it borders the Yuhangtang River in the south, hence the name. With an area of 8,700 mu, it is the largest single university campus in Mainland China.

History 
The construction of the eastern part of the campus was approved in October 2000, with planning starting in November, land expropriation starting in December.  During the planning period, the university launched a conception plan contest with Architecture Journal and a planning contest online, which received 76 planning designs from across the world. These designs were reviewed and moderated by renowned architects and designers. The construction formally began in September 2001, which was finished in October 2002.

Planning and design of the western part of the campus began in 2003, shortly after the completion of the eastern part. The construction began in May 2011. The western part came into use in 2019.

Design 
The eastern part of the campus is centred around the Qizhen Lake. The aim of the design is to building a modern, networked, gardened, ecological campus. Most buildings in the part are modern architectures with white exterior walls. The part is divided into several functional clusters, specialised for teaching, research and living, which are connected with a circuit road system. Between the functional clusters are a network of water bodies and gardens. However, the design of functional clusters also forces students and faculty to travel a long distance between the clusters for daily life, which popularises bicycles as a means of transport within the campus.

The western part of the campus is centred around the Qiushi Lake. Clustering of buildings are based on academic disciplines in order to building research-centred communities. These clusters are separated by rivers and the natural gardens alongside the rivers. In each cluster, academic buildings, typically with red brick exterior walls, centres around a courtyard, neighbouring research areas to the east. The Qiushi Academy cluster, which serves as museums and the auditorium, is a pseudo-classic architecture modelled after the traditional Chinese buildings of Qiushi Academy, the predecessor of the university.

Institutions 
All the administrative units headquarters and most of the academic departments headquarters at Zijingang. 

 Administrative units
 Office of the Presidents
 Development and Planning Office
 Office of Global Engagement 
 Human Resources Department 
 Undergraduate School 
 Graduate School
 Sci-Tech Academy of Zhejiang University
 Academy of Humanities and Social Sciences
 Office of Capital Construction 
 Administration of Continuing Education
 Division of Domestic Relations 
 Financial Department
 Office of Laboratory and Equipment Management
 News Office
 Medical Management Office
 Office of Safety and Security 
 Department of General Affairs
 Office of Safety and Security 

 Faculty of Arts and Humanities (headquartered)
 School of Humanities
 School of International Studies
 College of Media and International Culture
 Faculty of Agriculture, Life and Environment Science (headquartered)
 College of Life Sciences
 College of Biosystem Engineering and Food Science
 College of Environmental and Resource Sciences
 College of Agriculture and Biotechnology
 College of Animal Sciences
 Faculty of Medicine (headquartered)
 College of Pharmaceutical Sciences
 School of Medicine
 Faculty of Engineering
 College of Civil Engineering and Architecture

References

External links
Map of Zijingang Campus

Places of Zhejiang University